The Lead Mosque, also known as the Buşatlı Mehmet Pasha Mosque, is a historical mosque in Shkodër, northwestern Albania. 

It took the name Lead Mosque, because all of its cupolas were covered with lead.

History
The Lead Mosque was built in 1773 by the Albanian pasha Mehmed Bushati of the noble Bushati family, who was vizier of Pashalik of Scutari at the time. Through this act, he intended to give his city of birth, the feeling of the capital. It is said that the mosque's edifice was built on land owned by the catholic church.

Mehmed Bushati was personally involved with the construction and stones were incised under his patronage. Almost every day, he stepped down from his residence, the Rozafa Castle, to follow the progress of the works.

The first Imam of the mosque was Haxhi Ahmet Misria, who was of Egyptian origin. He came to Albania after the contacts he had with Mehmed Bushati. After him, other Imams served and also took care of the mosque.

Damages

During the 1900s, the mosque begun to be damaged and the lead that covered the cupolas was gradually stolen. In 1916, the remaining lead was removed by the Austrian army during the Austrian rule in Albania.

In 1967, lightning destroyed its minaret, which had been previously reconstructed in 1920 by Xhelal Bushati, descendant of Mehmed Bushati.

State atheism
In 1967, Lead Mosque was closed down, just like the other religious institutions, after the anti-religious communist leader Enver Hoxha declared Albania an atheist state. Unlike many mosques that were destroyed during this time, it survived from the communist regime, probably because it was declared a Cultural Monument in 1948.

Post-Communism
On 16 November 1990, the Lead Mosque preceded other mosques in Albania to reopen when religion was again allowed in the country. The very first religious rally was held in this mosque by Hafiz Sabri Koçi, after 23 years of state atheism.

Construction
The Lead Mosque has an Ottoman architecture, unlike most other mosques in Albania which follow Arab architecture. It closely mirrors the classical Ottoman architecture of Istanbul, Turkey, which was pioneered by architect Mimar Sinan of the 16th century.

The mosque is built with hewn stones of almost the same size, which creates a pleasant construction symmetry. Stones were brought from the nearby village of Gur i Zi by people who aligned to each other over kilometers passing the stones to reach the construction point.

Restoration
Flood damage in rainy seasons have resulted in damage to the Lead Mosque over time. The mosque has been repaired numerous times during its lifetime: in 1863, 1920 and in 1963. On 15 July 2021, the Albanian and Turkish governments funded restoration of the mosque.

Gallery

See also
 Islam in Albania

References

External links

Lead Mosque at Shkodër.net

Ottoman architecture in Albania
Religious buildings and structures completed in 1773
Tourist attractions in Shkodër
Cultural Monuments of Albania
18th-century mosques
Tourist attractions in Shkodër County
Mosques in Shkodër